Artem Shkurdyuk (born 20 August 1998) is a Belarusian professional footballer who plays for Gomel.

Honours
BATE Borisov
Belarusian Premier League champion: 2018

References

External links 
 
 

1998 births
Living people
Belarusian footballers
Association football defenders
FC BATE Borisov players
FC Energetik-BGU Minsk players
FC Gomel players